The Ox Mountains or Slieve Gamph are a mountain range in County Sligo on the west coast of Ireland. They are also known as Saint Patrick's Mountains after the saint who built churches on its slopes and left his name to some of its wells.

Geography 

The mountains begin immediately southwest of Ballysadare, and run west-southwest for some forty miles to the boundary of County Mayo, where they are continued to the southwest by the Slieve Gamph range, which runs first on the boundary of the two counties, and then into Mayo. The mountains have several summits from 1,200 to 1,800 feet high; and Slieve Gamph reaches 1,363 feet.

Geology

Lead and copper mines were formerly worked in the Ox Mountains, but by 1900, the works had been long since discontinued.

Peaks

References 

Mountains and hills of County Sligo